Protomyctophum subparallelum is a lanternfish in the family Myctophidae, found circumglobally in the southern hemisphere south of about 30° S, in deep water.  Its length is about 3.6 cm. It is a mesopelagic species.

References
 

Myctophidae
Fish described in 1932
Taxa named by Åge Vedel Tåning